Liberty Street Historic District is a national historic district located at Bath in Steuben County, New York. It contains 76 commercial, residential, ecclesiastical, and civic structures in the historic core of the village. The southern part of the district is centered on Pulteney Square, a three-acre village green containing landscaped gardens, walkways, benches, fountains and a gazebo. It was one of two village greens laid out in 1793. A broad range of building types, styles, and uses dating from about 1819 to 1930 characterize the district. See also .

It was listed on the National Register of Historic Places in 1983.

Gallery

See also
National Register of Historic Places listings in Steuben County, New York

References

External links

Historic districts on the National Register of Historic Places in New York (state)
Georgian architecture in New York (state)
Victorian architecture in New York (state)
Historic districts in Steuben County, New York
National Register of Historic Places in Steuben County, New York